Gilles Vincent Dufaux (born 13 December 1994) is a Swiss sport shooter.

He participated at the 2018 ISSF World Shooting Championships, winning a medal. He also participated in the European Championship 2017 in Baku, Azerbaijan, winning a medal.

References

External links

Living people
1994 births
Swiss male sport shooters
ISSF rifle shooters
21st-century Swiss people